The Princess of Bedford (Italian:La principessina di Bedford) is a 1914 Italian silent film directed by Roberto Roberti and starring Bice Valerian.

Cast
 Giuseppe De Witten 
 Frederico Elvezi 
 Minny Fosca 
 Maria Orciuoli 
 Leo Pezzinga 
 Bice Valerian 
 Claudia Zambuto

References

Bibliography
 Aldo Bernardini, Vittorio Martinelli. Il cinema muto italiano, Volume 6, Part 2. Nuova ERI, 1993.

External links

1914 films
1910s Italian-language films
Films directed by Roberto Roberti
Italian silent feature films
Italian black-and-white films